Johannes Theodorus Runnenburg (19 February 1932 – 16 April 2008) was a Dutch mathematician and professor of probability theory and analysis at the University of Amsterdam from 1962 to 1997.

Biography 
Born in Amsterdam he received his MA in Mathematics in 1956 at the University of Amsterdam, and his PhD cum laude in Mathematics and Physics in 1960 with a thesis entitled "On the Use of Markov Processes in One-server Waiting-time Problems and Renewal Theory" advised by Nicolaas Govert de Bruijn.

Runnenburg was appointed Lector in Probability theory and analysis at the University of Amsterdam in 1961. In 1962 he was promoted to Professor of Probability theory and analysis, and from 1966 to his retirement in 1997 was Professor of Pure and Applied Mathematics. Among his doctorate students were Gijsbert de Leve (1964), Laurens de Haan (1970), Fred Steutel (1971), Wim Vervaat (1972), August Balkema (1973), Frits Göbel (1974), Arie Hordijk (1974), Aegle Hoekstra (1983), Peter de Jong (1988) and Leo Klein Haneveld (1996).

Publications 
 Machines Served by a Patrolling Operator. 1957
 On the use of Markov processes in one-server waiting-time problems and renewal theory. 1960
 Einige voorbeelden van stochastische processen: openbare les  Universiteit van Amsterdam. 1961. 
 An Example Illustrating the Possibilities of Renewal Theory and Waiting-time Theory for Markov-dependent Arrival-intervals. 1961
 On K.L. Chung's problem of imbedding a time-discrete Markov chain in a time-continuous one for finitely many states. With Carel Louis Scheffer. Amsterdam : Mathematisch Centrum, 1962.

References

External links 
 Prof. dr. J.T. Runnenburg, 1932–2008

1932 births
2008 deaths
Dutch mathematicians
Scientists from Amsterdam
University of Amsterdam alumni
Academic staff of the University of Amsterdam